Acalolepta australis is a species of flat-faced longhorn beetle belonging to the family Cerambycidae, subfamily Lamiinae.

Description
The basic colour is blackish or reddish brown. Antennomeres I-III and the base of tibias show black spots.

Main host plants are Anisoptera polyandra, Araucaria cunninghamii, Hevea brasiliensis, Terminalia kaernbachii and Theobroma cacao.

Distribution
This species can be found in northern Australia, Moluccas, New Ireland (island), New Britain and New Guinea.

List of subspecies
Acalolepta australis australis (Boisduval, 1835)
Acalolepta australis keyensis Breuning, 1965
Acalolepta australis orientalis Breuning, 1982
Acalolepta australis parcepuncticollis Breuning, 1973
Acalolepta australis saintaignani Breuning, 1970

References
F. Vitali Notes on the genus Acalolepta Pascoe, 1858 (Coleoptera: Cerambycidae) from Indonesian Papua and the Moluccas
Biolib

External links
Cerambycoidea

Acalolepta
Beetles described in 1835